Widdringtonia nodiflora (mountain cypress) is a species of Widdringtonia native to Southern Africa. It usually grows at high altitudes, typically among rocks on mountainsides. Its foliage and wood are highly flammable while its natural habitat is prone to fire. To compensate, the species will coppice from its roots after being burnt down.

Description

It is an evergreen multistemmed shrub or small to rarely medium-sized tree growing to 5–7 m (rarely to 25 m) tall. The leaves are scale-like, 1.5–2 mm long and 1-1.5 mm broad on small shoots, up to 10 mm long on strong-growing shoots, and arranged in opposite decussate pairs. The cones are globose, 1–2 cm long, with four scales. Each tree produces both male and female cones. It is unique in the genus in its ability to coppice, readily re-sprouting from burnt or cut stumps; this enables it to survive wildfires, and is considered a major factor in allowing its abundance relative to the other species in the genus. Its wood is highly flammable - another adaptation for its fire-prone environment.

Distribution
It occurs naturally from Table Mountain in the south, to southern Malawi, southern Mozambique, eastern Zimbabwe and throughout eastern and southern South Africa. It is the only widespread species in its genus, and the only one not threatened or endangered. It is closely related to the endangered cypress ("Cedar") of the Cedarberg mountains.
As its name suggests, the Mountain Cypress is usually found at high altitudes on mountainsides, growing among rocks, and in gullies, typically in mountain fynbos and grassland. They normally occur in small groups, like the little forest of them on the mountain above Kirstenbosch.

Growing the mountain cypress
Planted in a pot, this tree makes an interesting (and reusable) southern hemisphere christmas tree. The Mountain Cypress makes an attractive, water-wise and environmentally friendly indigenous alternative to the pine tree.
This tree can be propagated from seed, sown during autumn in well-drained sand. The seeds germinate relatively well, over several weeks. It grows about 0.3 meters a year. It makes a good container plant and ornamental tree. It also grows well in a cool or wet climate and it is resistant to frost.

References

External links

Widdringtonia nodiflora

Afromontane flora
Flora of Malawi
Flora of Mozambique
Flora of Zimbabwe
Least concern plants
Ornamental trees
Trees of South Africa
nodiflora